Jeff Lenosky (Born April 19, 1971) is an American world class professional Freeride and Trials Mountain Bicycle Rider.

Career
Among his many athletic high points is the world record for the Bunny hop, a high jump event using a full size mountain bicycle. Lenosky competes in events world wide and performs demonstrations of his athletic riding skills along with products manufactured by his many sponsors. He has a signature frame and pedals developed with his design input. Mountain bike events world wide have been designed and constructed with his planning, design, and organizational skills. A review of mountain biking periodicals will reveal regular featured columns written by Lenosky featuring, how to, adventures, motivational and news to the novice and experienced enthusiast. Many DVD and VHS films are on the market from locations worldwide along with his many friends included in the screenplays. Lenosky rides for Shimano (Saint), REEB, and Pearl Izumi. He also rides for Vittoria, Oskar Blues and Orange Seal.

Personal information
He lives in Sparta Township, New Jersey with his wife Amy and their children, Jack, Katie and Max. He is a graduate of East Stroudsburg University of Pennsylvania.

References

1971 births
Living people
American male cyclists
East Stroudsburg University of Pennsylvania alumni
Mountain bike trials riders
Freeride mountain bikers
People from Sparta, New Jersey
American mountain bikers